ATMS may refer to
 Advanced Traffic Management System for highways.
 Advanced Train Management System for railways.
 IBM Administrative Terminal System#ATMS, IBM's successor to ATS/360,